Michael East (or Easte, Est, Este) (ca. 1580–1648) was an English organist and composer. He was a nephew of London music publisher Thomas East (ca. 1540–1608), although it was once 
thought that he was his son.

In 1601, East wrote a madrigal that was accepted by Thomas Morley for publication in his collection The Triumphs of Oriana. In 1606, he received a Bachelor of Music degree from the University of Cambridge and in 1609 he joined the choir of Ely Cathedral, initially as a lay clerk. By 1618 he was employed by Lichfield Cathedral, where he worked as a choirmaster, probably until 1644, when the Civil War brought an end to sung services. Elias Ashmole was a chorister at Lichfield, and later recalled that "Mr Michael East … was my tutor for song and Mr Henry Hinde, organist of the Cathedral … taught me on the virginals and organ".

East's exact date of death is not known, but he died at Lichfield. His will was written on 7 January 1648 and proved on 9 May 1648. It mentions his wife Dorothy, daughter Mary Hamersly, and a son and grandson both named Michael.

His most highly regarded works are his five-part fantasies for viols: Thurston Dart is quoted as saying, "despite some slipshod part-writing, they are among the best five-part consorts of the time".

Works
East was one of the most published composers of his era ; he published seven groups of compositions:
 Groups 1 and 2: madrigals for three and five voices
 Groups 3 and 4: anthems, madrigals, pastorales, napolitans and fancies for four to six voices (including instrumental fancies for viol consort)
 Group 5: twenty three-part pieces for viol
 Group 6: anthems and sacred consort songs for five and six voices, together with a setting of a poem by Sir Henry Wotton, honouring Princess Elizabeth, daughter of James I.
 Group 7: viol works for two to four voices

References

External links

Sheet music for songs
Biography at hoasm.org

1580s births
1648 deaths
English classical composers
English Baroque composers
English classical organists
British male organists
Classical composers of church music
17th-century English composers
People of the Tudor period
17th-century classical composers
English male classical composers
Male classical organists